"No 1/2 Steppin'" (pronounced No Half Steppin) is a song by Shanice Wilson.  It was the second single released from Discovery. It became her second top 10 hit on the Billboard R&B chart.

Music video
The music video includes a dance routine and shows a white background.

Track listing

12" single (012256) USA
A1. "No 1/2 Steppin'" (Club Mix) (7:42)
A2. "No 1/2 Steppin'" (7" Edit) (3:55)
B1. "No 1/2 Steppin'" (Radio Version) (5:45)
B2. "No 1/2 Steppin'" (Dub Version) (4:10)

Charts

References

Shanice songs
1988 singles
Songs written by Bryan Loren
1987 songs
A&M Records singles
Freestyle music songs